"I Believe (Get Over Yourself)" is a song by American alternative rock band Nico Vega, and Dan Reynolds (of Imagine Dragons). The song was originally recorded for the band's second album Lead to Light (July 22, 2014).

Live performances and media use
Nico Vega performed "I Believe (Get Over Yourself)" on VH1's Big Morning Buzz Live (Ep. 947, 2014) and Guitar Center Sessions (Ep. 81, 2014) hosted by Nic Harcourt.

The track was featured in the trailer for HBO's Girls (TV series) season 4.

Music video
Nico Vega released the music video for "I Believe (Get Over Yourself)" on June 19, 2014.

References

External links
 Nico Vega official website

Nico Vega songs
2014 songs
Songs written by Dan Reynolds (musician)